"Lies" is a song performed by South Korean boy band g.o.d. It was the title track from their third album Chapter 3, which was released in 2000. At the time of its release, the song became one of the group's most popular songs, dominating the rankings in music programs, and is still considered one of their representative songs and a classic K-pop song of the early 2000s. In a 2006 poll conducted by Gallup Korea, 1,500 Koreans aged 13 and above listed their five favorite songs and "Lies" was ranked 22nd out of the top 100 songs named. In a 2016 survey conducted by The Dong-a Ilbo in which thirty music industry experts and nearly 2,000 citizens participated, "Lies" was voted third in the category of the greatest K-pop songs of the past twenty years.

Overview
The lyrics and music were composed by Park Jin-young. Jun Ji-hyun, who was a fellow SidusHQ artist at that time, features briefly following Park Joon-hyung's rap and was revealed to have provided the voice for the now iconic line "I hate you!" (싫어, 싫어!). At that time, the group was not managed by his company JYP Entertainment but he worked closely with them as a producer and songwriter. The music video featured then-unknown Korean American actor Sung Kang, who went on to gain fame portraying Han Lue in the successful film franchise The Fast and the Furious.

The song is particularly notable for its unique "fan chants". During live performances of the song by g.o.d, the audience chants each member's nicknames after the member has sung his line.

Awards and nominations
"Lies" won 9 music program awards, including three "triple crowns" (ranked #1 for three consecutive weeks) on the music programs SBS's Inkigayo, KBS's Music Bank and MBC's Music Camp (the former incarnation of Show! Music Core). With "Lies" winning a third consecutive #1 win on Inkigayo, the group won their third "Triple Crown" within the calendar year (2000).

Notable cover versions
The song has been covered and performed numerous times in special segments featuring "legendary" hit songs due its status as one of g.o.d's most famous and popular songs. In 2011, Kim Tae-woo, Son Ho-young and Danny Ahn performed the song during the "Legends" segment of the Music Bank special celebrating 600 episodes. Groups who have recently covered the song since g.o.d's reunion include B1A4 (MBC's Gayo Daejejeon) and BtoB (SBS's Inkigayo). The chorus was sampled as part a mash-up performed by JYP Entertainment artists JB (GOT7), Woojin and Bang Chan (Stray Kids) and Nayeon and Jihyo (Twice) for the "JYP Of All Time" special segment, which paid tribute to Park Jin-young's biggest hit songs over the past two decades, during the 2018 KBS Song Festival.
Henry on Mnet's Sing Again, Hera Gu episode 10 (mash-up with "Road" by g.o.d)
Lee Soo-jung (K-pop Star season 5 round 5)

References

External links
Track Information – Mnet 

G.o.d songs
2000 songs
Korean-language songs
Songs written by Park Jin-young